Dainwind  is a village in Kapurthala district of Punjab State, India. The village is administrated by a Sarpanch, who is an elected representative.

Demography 
According to the report published by Census India in 2011, Dainwind has a total number of 187 houses and population of 892 of which include 448 males and 444 females. Literacy rate of Dainwind is 64.30%, lower than state average of 75.84%. The population of children under the age of 6 years is 133 which is  14.91% of total population of Dainwind, and child sex ratio is approximately  928, higher than state average of 846.

Population data

Caste  
The village has schedule caste (SC) constitutes 79.93% of total population of the village and it doesn't have any Schedule Tribe (ST) population.

Transport

Air  
The nearest domestic airport is located 79.19 km away in Ludhiana and the nearest international airport is Sri Guru Ram Dass Jee International Airport is the nearest airport which is 68.45 km away in Amritsar.

Air travel connectivity 
The closest airport to the village is Sri Guru Ram Dass Jee International Airport.

Villages in Kapurthala

External links
  Villages in Kapurthala
 Kapurthala Villages List

References

Villages in Kapurthala district